Fabbiani is a surname. Notable people with the surname include:

 Cristian Fabbiani (born 1983), Argentine professional footballer
 Juan Vicente Fabbiani (1910–1989), Venezuelan painter
 Mariana Fabbiani (born 1975), Argentine Martín Fierro Award-winning TV hostess, actress, model and singer
 Óscar Fabbiani (born 1950), Argentine-Chilean professional footballer

See also
 Fabiana (disambiguation)
 Fabiani, surname
 Fabiania, genus of moths
 Fabiano, given name and surname

Italian-language surnames